The Battle of Kef was a Battle fought in 1694, between the Deylik of Algiers, and Muradid Tunis, during the Tunisian-Algerian War of 1694.

Battle 
On June 24, the same day that the Tunisian-Algerian war started, the Algerians arrived under Kef. Mohamed Bey attempting to save himself allied with the Moroccans, albeit as they had no common borders, the Moroccans could do nothing other than send him weaponry. Knowing that his weak army couldn't defeat the Algerian one, he decided to offer a tribute to the Algerians Hadj Chabane refused this, and attacked the Tunisians after 2 unsuccessful attacks carried about by Mohamed Bey. The battle ended in a catastrophic defeat for the Tunisians, who started fleeing from the invading forces.

Aftermath 
Mohamed bey retreated into Tunis and planned on fortifying the town, and holding back the Algerian forces.

References 

Military history of Algeria
Military history of Tunisia
1694